Khan-Tuvan Dyggvi, according to Omeljan Pritsak, was the name of a Khazar khagan of the mid 830s. He led a rebellion of the Kabars against the Khagan Bek. As this rebellion took place roughly contemporaneously with the conversion of the Khazars to Judaism, Pritsak and others have speculated that the rebellion had a religious aspect.
Omeljan Pritsak speculated that a Khazar khagan named Khan-Tuvan Dyggvi, exiled after losing a civil war, settled with his followers in the Norse-Slavic settlement of Rostov, married into the local Scandinavian nobility, and fathered the dynasty of the Rus' khagans. Constantine Zuckerman dismisses Pritsak's theory as untenable speculation, and no record of any Khazar khagan fleeing to find refuge among the Rus' exists in contemporaneous sources. Nevertheless, the possible Khazar connection to early Rus' monarchs is supported by the use of a stylized trident tamga, or seal, by later Rus' rulers such as Sviatoslav I of Kiev; similar tamgas are found in ruins that are definitively Khazar in origin.

See also
Rus' Khaganate

Notes

References
Brook, Kevin Alan. The Jews of Khazaria . 2d ed. Rowman and Littlefield, 2006.
Duczko, Władysław. Viking Rus: Studies on the Presence of Scandinavians in Eastern Europe. Brill, 2004.
Franklin, Simon and Jonathan Shepard. The Emergence of Rus 750-1200. London: Longman, 1996. .
Pritsak, Omeljan. The Origin of Rus'. Cambridge Mass.: Harvard University Press, 1991.
Pritsak, Omeljan. ''The Origins of the Old Rus' Weights and Monetary Systems. Cambridge, MA: Harvard Ukrainian Research Institute, 1998.

Khazar rulers
9th-century rulers in Europe